In mathematics, in particular in knot theory, the Conway knot (or Conway's knot) is a particular knot with 11 crossings, named after John Horton Conway.

It is related by mutation to the Kinoshita–Terasaka knot, with which it shares the same Jones polynomial. Both knots also have the curious property of having the same Alexander polynomial and Conway polynomial as the unknot.

The issue of the sliceness of the Conway knot was resolved in 2020 by Lisa Piccirillo, 50 years after John Horton Conway first proposed the knot. Her proof made use of Rasmussen's s-invariant, and showed that the knot is not a smoothly slice knot, though it is topologically slice (the Kinoshita–Terasaka knot is both).

References

External links 
 Conway knot on The Knot Atlas.
 Conway knot  illustrated by knotilus.

Prime knots and links
John Horton Conway